The year 1883 in architecture involved some significant events.

Buildings and structures

Buildings

 March 10 – The Ames Free Library opens to the public "without fanfare and ceremony." Designed by Henry Hobson Richardson.
 May 1 – The Examination Schools of the University of Oxford, designed by Thomas G. Jackson, are formally opened.
 May 24 – Brooklyn Bridge, designed by John A. Roebling, is completed.
 May 26 – Cathedral of Christ the Saviour in Moscow, designed by Konstantin Thon, is dedicated.
 August 29 – Dunfermline Carnegie Library opened, the first of over 2,500 Carnegie Libraries funded by Andrew Carnegie.
 Albany City Hall in Albany, New York, designed by Henry Hobson Richardson in 'Richardsonian Romanesque' style, is completed.
 Vienna City Hall (Rathaus), designed by Friedrich von Schmidt in Gothic Revival style, is completed.
 The Home Insurance Building in Chicago designed by William LeBaron Jenney (demolished 1931).
 The Kuhns Building in Dayton, Ohio, is constructed.
 Hotel Windsor (Melbourne), Australia, designed by Charles Webb, is completed.
 Cane Hill Hospital in Coulsdon, London, is completed.
 Coney Hill Hospital (Gloucestershire County Asylum) in Gloucester, England, designed by John Giles and Edward Gough, is partially completed.
 Waddesdon Manor in Buckinghamshire, England, designed by Gabriel-Hippolyte Destailleur, is opened for guests.
 Billings Memorial Library at the University of Vermont in Burlington, designed by Henry Hobson Richardson, is built.
 New Church, Anerley, London, designed by W. J. E. Henley of the Concrete Building Company, completed.

Awards
 RIBA Royal Gold Medal – Francis Penrose.
 Grand Prix de Rome, architecture: Gaston Redon.

Births

 January 8 – Robert Atkinson, English Art Deco architect (died 1952)
 February 15 – Richard Konwiarz, German architect (died 1960)
 May 18 – Walter Gropius, German modernist architect (died 1969)
 May 28 – Clough Williams-Ellis, British architect (died 1978)
 June 25 – Paul Bartholomew, American architect (died 1973)
 August 23 – Alker Tripp, English town planner (died 1954)
 August 30 – Theo van Doesburg, Dutch De Stijl architect (died 1931)
 December 19 – Barry Byrne, American Prairie School architect (died 1967)

Deaths
 June 3 – Emilio De Fabris, Italian architect (born 1808)
 October 22 – John Henry Chamberlain, English Gothic Revival architect working in Birmingham (born 1831)

References

Arch
Architecture
Years in architecture
19th-century architecture